Frantic Bleep is a progressive metal band from Norway.

History
Frantic Bleep was founded in November 2001 in Kongsvinger, Norway. The original instrumentation was Patrick Scantlebury playing guitars and synthesizers, Eywin Sundstrom on guitars and Karl Arthur Renstrøm on the drums. In November 2002, they released four songs for their first and only demo CD called Fluctuadmission. During the recording, Paul Mozart Bjørke joined the group as a studio member on vocals and bass.

Although a debut demo, the release gained positive feedback. There was enough positive feedback for the band to receive offers from several labels, one of which was The End Records, with whom they signed with in the summer of 2003.

Karl Arthur Renstrøm was replaced by Sten Erik Svendheim in July 2003. The band began recording their debut album, The Sense Apparatus in October 2003. The recording took an entire year to complete. The album was produced by Patrick Scantlebury with artwork by Christian Ruud. The album also features Kjetil Foseid, Daniel Solheim and Agnete M. Kirkevaag (Madder Mortem) performing various vocal duties. In 2004/2005, Lars Gunnar Morastseter and Trond Sand, both previous from the Norwegian Death Metal band The Laughing Man, joined Frantic Bleep. Writing and rehearsals for the second studio album started around the time the band played their first, and so far only, live gig in their hometown of Kongsvinger during the month of August 2005.

As of 2009, the album was announced as being in progress, and had a tentative release date of 2009, but as of June 2012, there has been no updates from the band.

Members

Current members
Eywin Sundstrom - Bass, Guitars (2001–Present)
Patrick Scantlebury - Guitars, Synthesizers (2001–Present)
Lars Gunnar Morastseter - Guitars (2004–Present)
Trond Sand - Drums (2005–Present)
B.P.M. Kirkevaag - Vocals (2007-present)

Former members
Paul Mozart Bjørke - Vocals, Bass (2001–2003) (Session Only)
Karl Arthur Renstrøm - Drums (2001–2003)
Sten Erik Svendheim - Drums (2003–2005)
Kjetil Foseid - Vocals (2004–2007)

Timeline

Discography
Fluctuadmission (2002) - Demo
The Sense Apparatus (2005) - LP

External links
Official Homepage
Label Profile
Official Myspace site

Norwegian progressive metal musical groups
Musical groups established in 2001
2001 establishments in Norway
Musical groups from Hedmark
Musicians from Kongsvinger